Sandy Yates (born 17 January 1979) is a former New Zealand rugby union player. She made her debut, and only appearance, for New Zealand on 16 June 2001 against England at Albany, New Zealand.

Yates played club rugby for Manurewa and briefly for Ponsonby. She played provincially for Counties Manukau.

References 

1979 births
Living people
New Zealand women's international rugby union players
New Zealand female rugby union players
Rugby union players from Auckland